The Psychomodo is the second studio album by Cockney Rebel, which was released by EMI in 1974. It was produced by Steve Harley and Alan Parsons.

Background
Cockney Rebel's debut album, The Human Menagerie, was released in 1973 and failed to make an appearance in the UK Albums Chart. The single "Sebastian" was also a failure in the UK, but did achieve success in Continental Europe. The lack of UK success for Cockney Rebel left their label, EMI, feeling the band had yet to record a potential hit single. In response, Harley went away and reworked his unrecorded song "Judy Teen", which was released in March 1974 and became a UK Top 5 hit. By the time the single was released, Cockney Rebel were already in the process of recording their second album, The Psychomodo.

From 25 May to 7 July 1974, Cockney Rebel embarked on a major British tour to promote The Psychomodo. Due to the success of "Judy Teen", which was climbing the UK charts while the band were on the tour, some of the concerts saw riots break out and others had to be rebooked at larger venues due to the demand for tickets. As the tour progressed, Cockney Rebel faced growing tensions which ultimately led to their split at the end of the tour in late July. Jean-Paul Crocker, Milton Reame-James and Paul Jeffreys quit the band after Harley refused to comply with their demands to write material for the group, despite the initial understanding that Cockney Rebel was a vehicle for Harley's songs.

Later in 1974, Harley finalised a new line-up for the band and then continued recording and touring under the name Steve Harley & Cockney Rebel. The only remaining member of the original line-up to continue with Harley was drummer Stuart Elliott. In 1975, the band reached the UK number-one spot with "Make Me Smile (Come Up and See Me)", the lyrics of which were vindictively directed at Harley's former band members who, he felt, had abandoned him.

Speaking to Record & Popswop Mirror in November 1974, Harley spoke of The Psychomodo in relation to his songwriting for the next Cockney Rebel album, The Best Years of Our Lives, "I find that I'm not writing in such a surrealistic way anymore. I'm writing slightly more blatant, less subtle. I mean the subtleties of The Psychomodo tended to get lost I think. I think 'Sling It' is probably the best concealed important statement on the album, but it's gone above everyone's head as far as I can make out." He added that The Psychomodo was "very much a concept: psychomodal – stream of consciousness".

Recording
Cockney Rebel recorded The Psychomodo in February and March 1974 at Morgan Studios, Nova Sound Studios and Air Studios in London. It was mastered at Abbey Road Studios. The album saw Harley receive his first production credit, as he produced the album alongside producer Alan Parsons. In similarity to "Sebastian" and "Death Trip" from The Human Menagerie, a large symphony orchestra and choir was used on "Tumbling Down", with orchestral arrangements conducted by Andrew Powell.

In 2012, Harley recalled of his experience recording the album, "The Psychomodo was a record whose time we laughed through. Alan Parsons came in as co-producer and his own willingness to accept many offbeat ideas made life easy enough. More strings and horns, and again we had Andrew Powell, with his brilliant classical-rock thinking, to orchestrate."

In a 1974 interview with Music Scene, violinist Jean-Paul Crocker expressed his opinion that The Psychomodo was a much stronger album than The Human Menagerie. He commented, "I think it's more of a development than could ever have been expected. It's a completely different album and the basic difference is in the way we're playing on it. We wanted the first album to be heavier than it was, but it turned out quite weak, and we sounded like a bleedin' folk group most of the time."

Release
The Psychomodo was released by EMI in the UK and Europe in June 1974. Preceding the album was the first single, the title track "Psychomodo". It was released in mid-May 1974, but was quickly withdrawn in the UK as "Judy Teen" continued to climb the charts. It was given a full release in Europe and entered the charts in Belgium. When it was released in June, The Psychomodo proved to be the band's breakthrough in the UK Albums Chart. It reached its peak at number 8 on 14 September 1974, by which time Cockney Rebel had split up.

In late July 1974, EMI released "Mr. Soft" as the album's second single. It was a chart success, reaching number 8 in the UK Singles Chart. Harley had to form two impromptu line-ups of Cockney Rebel in order to perform the song on Top of the Pops. When EMI released The Psychomodo in the US in January 1975 (as Steve Harley & Cockney Rebel), "Tumbling Down" was issued as a promotional single.

The album received its first CD release by EMI in 1990. It included two bonus tracks, Harley's 1974 debut solo single "Big Big Deal", and the B-side of the "Psychomodo" and "Mr. Soft" singles, "Such a Dream". In 2001, BGO Records reissued the album in the UK, but without any bonus tracks.

In 2012, the album was included in its entirety on the remastered four-disc box-set anthology compilation album Cavaliers: An Anthology 1973–1974. The release also included previously unreleased 'early versions' of many of the debut album tracks, as well as B-sides and live tracks from the period. On 24 November 2012, Steve Harley & Cockney Rebel, supported by an orchestra and chamber choir, performed The Human Menagerie and The Psychomodo albums in their entirety live at the Birmingham Symphony Hall. The performance was released in 2013 as CD and DVD releases under the title Birmingham (Live with Orchestra & Choir). The same show was performed live four more times in 2014 at Manchester's Bridgewater Hall, Sage Gateshead, London's Royal Albert Hall, and again at the Birmingham Symphony Hall.

Critical reception

On its release, Jeff Ward of Melody Maker noted that The Psychomodo is "intrepid manic music, lashed by an obsessive creative drive and wonderfully defiant of accepted forms". He added, "Packed with intrigue, it's the kind of thing that should stop people looking at rock through a rear-view mirror. Cockney Rebel are of today, and of the future". Charles Shaar Murray of New Musical Express was less positive, stating that the majority of the album is "disposable". He wrote, "On the first side, 'Mr Soft' succeeds primarily on the strength of the arrangement, but it's 'Ritz' that justifies the existence of the album. One good track don't make a star, but Harley has proved that he does have something going."

Bob Scallon of the Acton Gazette wrote, "On the plus side, Harley is gifted with an unusual and distinctive voice, and is a very original songwriter. On the minus side, however, I don't think he has quite licked the band into shape yet and the demanding arrangements on several of the tracks of The Psychomodo sometimes seem a bit beyond them musically. They make all the right noises, but the vital spark is somehow missing." In the US, Cash Box commented, "Cockney Rebel are even more explosive on their second LP than they were on the first. The band goes far afield occasionally, but only in an attempt to refine and define their sound to a universal pitch. The record moves with intensity and purpose and in every way lives up to the band's reputation as a great live act."

Retrospective reviews

Dave Thompson of AllMusic retrospectively said, "If The Human Menagerie was a journey into the bowels of decadent cabaret, The Psychomodo is like a trip to the circus. Except the clowns were more sickly perverted than clowns normally are, and the fun house was filled with rattlesnakes and spiders. Such twists on innocent childhood imagery have transfixed authors from Ray Bradbury to Stephen King, but Steve Harley and Cockney Rebel were the first band to set that same dread to music, and the only ones to make it work." In a 2012 review of Cavaliers: An Anthology 1973-1974, Uncut stated, "The Psychomodo is anything but effete. 'Ritz' and 'Cavaliers' fathom its For Your Pleasure-era Roxy Music depths, and Harley signs off in style on 'Tumbling Down'."

Track listing
All songs written and composed by Steve Harley.

Personnel
Cockney Rebel
 Steve Harley – vocals
 Jean-Paul Crocker – electric violin, guitar
 Milton Reame-James – keyboards
 Paul Jeffreys – Fender bass
 Stuart Elliott – drums, percussion

Production
 Steve Harley, Alan Parsons – producers
 Peter Flanagan – engineer (Morgan Studios)
 Richard Dodd – engineer (Nova Sound)
 Geoff Emerick – engineer (AIR Studios)
 John Middleton – engineer (AIR Studios)
 Andrew Powell – orchestral and brass arrangements
 Chris Blair – mastering

Sleeve
 Mick Rock – photography, sleeve design, etc.

Charts

References

1974 albums
Steve Harley & Cockney Rebel albums
EMI Records albums
Albums produced by Alan Parsons
Albums recorded at Morgan Sound Studios
Albums with cover art by Mick Rock